Ayoub Amraoui (born 14 May 2004) is a professional footballer who plays as a left-back for Ligue 1 club Nice. Born in France, he is a youth international for Morocco.

Club career
Amraoui is a youth product of Ollioules, Racing Toulon and SC Air Bel and joined Nice's youth side in 2019. On 20 June 2021, he signed a professional contract until 2024. He made his professional debut with Nice as a starter in a 3–0 Ligue 1 win over Monaco 
on 26 February 2023.

International career
Born in France, Amraoui is of Moroccan descent. He was called up to the Morocco U20s for a set of friendlies in March 2022. He made one appearance for the U20s against the Romania U20s in a 2–2 friendly tie on 29 March 2022.

References

External links
 
 OGC Nice profile

2004 births
Living people
People from La Seyne-sur-Mer
Moroccan footballers
Morocco youth international footballers
French footballers
French sportspeople of Moroccan descent
Association football fullbacks
OGC Nice players
Ligue 1 players
Championnat National 3 players